Newark Board of Education is a comprehensive community public school district that serves students in pre-kindergarten through twelfth grade in the  city of Newark in Essex County, New Jersey, United States. The state took over the district in 1995 -- the third takeover statewide -- and returned control in 2018, after 22 years. The district is one of 31 former Abbott districts statewide that were established pursuant to the decision by the New Jersey Supreme Court in Abbott v. Burke which are now referred to as "SDA Districts" based on the requirement for the state to cover all costs for school building and renovation projects in these districts under the supervision of the New Jersey Schools Development Authority.

As of the 2020–21 school year, the district, comprised of 63 schools, had an enrollment of 40,423 students and 2,886.5 classroom teachers (on an FTE basis), for a student–teacher ratio of 14.0:1.

The total school enrollment in Newark city was 75,000 in 2003. Pre-primary school enrollment was 12,000 and elementary or high school enrollment was 46,000 children. College enrollment was 16,000. As of 2003, 64% of people 25 years and over had at least graduated from high school and 11% had a bachelor's degree or higher. Among people 16 to 19 years old, 10 percent were dropouts; they were not enrolled in school and had not graduated from high school.

The district is classified by the New Jersey Department of Education as being in District Factor Group "A", the lowest of eight groupings. District Factor Groups organize districts statewide to allow comparison by common socioeconomic characteristics of the local districts. From lowest socioeconomic status to highest, the categories are A, B, CD, DE, FG, GH, I and J.

History
In 1948 schools were racially integrated. There were black teachers, all of whom classified by the district as "permanent substitutes", teaching all grade levels.

The district is one of three districts in New Jersey (along with Jersey City Public Schools and Paterson Public Schools) that has historically been under "state intervention", which authorizes the state Commissioner of Education to intervene in governance of a local public school district (and to intervene in the areas of instruction and program, operations, personnel, and fiscal management). Chris Cerf was the state appointed superintendent of Newark. Cerf said he would resign on February 1, 2018, the day local control was be returned to the district.

Roger Leon, a life long Newark resident and educator was elected by the local school board to replace Cerf by a unanimous 9-0 vote and took office July 1, 2018.

In a referendum held as part of the November 2018 general election, voters chose by a 3-1 margin to have the district function as Type II district, in which the board of education is elected by the residents of the city.

Administration 
Core members of the district's administration are:
 Roger Leon, District Superintendent of Schools
 Valerie Wilson, School Business Administrator

Board of Education
The district's board of education, comprised of nine members, sets policy and oversees the fiscal and educational operation of the district through its administration. As a Type II school district, the board's trustees are elected directly by voters to serve three-year terms of office on a staggered basis, with three seats up for election each year held as part of the April school election. The board appoints a superintendent to oversee the district's day-to-day operations and a business administrator to supervise the business functions of the district. As one of the 13 districts statewide with school elections in April, voters also decide on passage of the annual school budget.

Members of the board of education are:

 Dawn Hayes (2018-2024) President
 Asia J. Norton (2018-2024) Co-Vice President
Vereliz Santana (2021-2024) Co-Vice President
Hasani K. Council (2020-2023) Board Member
 Josephine C. Garcia (2017-2023) Board Member
 Daniel Gonzalez (2021-2025) Board Member
Flohisha Johnson (2017-2023) Board Member
 A'Dorian Murray-Thomas (2019-2025) Board Member
Crystal Williams (2022 -2025) Board Member

State intervention
The district was one of three districts in New Jersey historically under "state intervention", which authorizes the Commissioner of Education to intervene in governance of a local public school district (and to intervene in the areas of instruction and program, operations, personnel, and fiscal management) if the Commissioner has determined that a school district failed or was unable to take corrective actions necessary to establish a thorough and efficient system of education.

State intervention has been criticized as undemocratic and racist. Some also have suggested that children were significantly harmed during state control. State intervention in Newark has not produced significant gains after more than two decades of state control. When viewed through the lens of student growth percentiles, which is a contested measure of growth, NPS may be higher. However, NPS may have had equally high growth before state intervention, so no comparisons are possible.

Chris Cerf and others paid by the state of New Jersey have suggested state control has been good for Newark. However, no measures of the quality of NPS's broad offerings before, during, or after state intervention have been identified. No measures of progress are available for earth science, physics, biology, chemistry, health, citizenship, world history, US history, literature, sociology, anthropology, ethnic studies, New Jersey history, gender studies, media studies, Africana studies, economics, politics, astronomy, geology, philosophy, archaeology, or performing arts. No measures of students' physical wellbeing, social wellbeing, or emotional wellbeing are available before, during, or after state control. No measures of parental wellbeing have been identified.

Local control was returned as of February 1, 2018.

Performance 
The Newark Public Schools is the largest school system in New Jersey. The city's public schools had been among the lowest-performing in the state, even after the state government took over management of the city's schools from 1995-2018, which was done under the presumption that improvement would follow.

Although the school district continues to struggle with low high school graduation rates and low standardized test scores, the former mayor of Newark, Cory Booker, insisted in 2010, "Newark, New Jersey can become one of the first American cities to solve the crisis in public education." This vision for better school district is also shared by Facebook founder Mark Zuckerberg, who made a $100 million donation to Newark Public Schools in 2010. "Every child deserves a good education. Right now that's not happening," he said. The management has been criticized: while interviews with administration regarding Newark's schools were always positive, highlighting only the good aspects of the huge monetary donation, new contracts were being created, money was being hemorrhaged, and the district was going broke. According to The New Yorker, Anderson, Booker, Zuckerberg, and Christie, "despite millions of dollars spent on community engagement—have yet to hold tough, open conversations with the people of Newark about exactly how much money the district has, where it is going, and what students aren't getting as a result."

Awards, recognition and rankings

Ann Street School of Mathematics and Science was awarded the Blue Ribbon School Award of Excellence by the United States Department of Education, the highest award an American school can receive, during the 1998-99 school year.

Branch Brook Elementary School, a Pre-Kindergarten through 4th grade school, was awarded the Blue Ribbon School Award of Excellence, during the 2004-05 school year.

During the 2007–08 school year, Harriet Tubman School was recognized with the Blue Ribbon School Award of Excellence by the United States Department of Education.

During the 2009-10 school year, Science Park High School was awarded the Blue Ribbon School Award of Excellence.

For the 2005-06 school year, the district was recognized with the "Best Practices Award" by the New Jersey Department of Education for its "A Park Study: Learning About the World Around Us" Science program at Abington Avenue School. The curriculum was written, implemented, and submitted to the State of New Jersey by Abington Avenue School kindergarten teacher, Lenore Furman.

After efforts at his dismissal as New Jersey's poet laureate, Amiri Baraka was named the school district's poet laureate in December 2002.

Schools
Schools in the district (with 2020–21 enrollment data from the National Center for Education Statistics) are:

Preschools
 Early Childhood Center - Central (154; PreK)
Jeanne Ramirez, Principal
 Early Childhood Center - North (128; PreK)
Jeanne Ramirez, Principal
 Early Childhood Center - South (180; PreK)
Jeanne Ramirez, Principal

Elementary schools

 Abington Avenue School (879; PreK-8)
Nelson Ruiz, Principal
 Ann Street School (1,243; KG-8)
Linda J. Richardson, Principal
 Avon Avenue Elementary School (551; K-8)
Charity Haygood, Principal
 Belmont Runyon Elementary School (451; PK-8)
Dr. Shakirah Harrington, Principal
 Benjamin Franklin Elementary School  (616; PK-7)
 Bruce Street School for the Deaf (58; PreK-8)
Kyle Thomas, Principal
 Camden Street Elementary School (596; PreK-8)
Samuel Garrison, Principal
 Roberto Clemente School (678; PreK-7)
Dr. Claudio Barbaran, Principal
 George Washington Carver School (508; PK-8)
Kyle Thomas, Principal
 Chancellor Avenue School (500; KG-8)
Sakina Pitts, Principal
 Cleveland Elementary School (418; PK-8)
Claire Emmanuel, Acting Principal
 East Ward Elementary School (383; PK-8)
Rosa Monteiro-Inacio, Principal
 Elliott Street Elementary School (954; PK-8)
Karisa DeSantis, Principal
 First Avenue School (1,139; PK-8)
Rosa Branco, Principal
 Fourteenth Avenue School (112; PK-8)
Armando Cepero, Principal
 Dr. E. Alma Flagg School (433; KG-8)
Ganiat Rufai, Principal
 Hawkins Street School (675; KG-8)
Alejandro Lopez, Principal
 Hawthorne Avenue School (466; PK-8)
H. Grady James IV, Principal
 Rafael Hernandez School (704; PreK-8)
Natasha Pared, Principal
 Dr. William H. Horton School (742; K-8)
Hamlet Marte, Principal
 Ivy Hill School (517; PK-8)
Dorrice Rayam-Johnson, Principal
 Lafayette Street School (1,202; PK-8)
Maria Merlo, Principal
 Lincoln Elementary School (394; PK-8)
Hillary Dow, Principal
 Michelle Obama Elementary School (PK-2)
LaShanda Gilliam, Principal
 Luis Muñoz Marín School (802; PK-8)
Kenneth Montalbano, Principal
 McKinley Elementary School (785; PK-8)
Carlos Reyes, Principal
 Mount Vernon Place School (816; PK-8)
Camille Findley-Browne, Principal
 Oliver Street School (1080; PreK-8)
Luis Henriques, Principal
 Park Elementary School (848; PreK-8)
Sylvia Esteves, Principal
 Peshine Academy (642; PreK-8)
Malcolm X Outlaw, Principal
 Quitman Street School (546; PreK-8)
 Ridge Street School (637; K-8)
David DeOliveira, Principal
 Sir Isaac Newton Elementary School (57; PK-2)
 South Seventeenth Street School (354; K-8)
Clarence Allen, Principal
 South Street School (798; PK-5)
Sandra Cruz, Principal
 Speedway Avenue School (579; K-8)
Atiba Buckman, Principal
 Louise A. Spencer School (738; PK-8)
Karla Venezia, Principal
 Sussex Avenue School (426; PK-8)
Darleen Gearhart, Principal
 Thirteenth Avenue School / Dr. Martin Luther King Jr. School (619; PreK-8)
Simone Rose, Principal
 Harriet Tubman School (373; PK-8)
Angela Davis, Principal
 Salomé Ureña Elementary School (368; PreK-7)
Sandra Marques, Principal
 Wilson Avenue School (1,135; K-8)
Margarita Hernandez, Principal

High schools
High schools in the district (with 2020–21 enrollment data from the National Center for Education Statistics) are:
 Newark Arts High School (614; 9-12)
Ricardo Pedro, Principal
 American History High School (445; 9-12)
Allison R. DeVaughn, Principal
 Barringer High School (1,600; 9-12)
Dr. Jose Aviles, Principal
 Bard High School Early College Newark (406; 9-12)
Dr. Carla Stephens, Principal
 Central High School (729; 9-12)
Dr. Sharnee Brown, Principal
 Eagle Academy for Young Men (197; 6-12)
Semone Morant, Principal
 East Side High School (2,024; 9-12)
Dr. Michael West, Principal
 Malcolm X Shabazz High School (360; 9-12)
Naseed Gifted, Principal
 Newark Evening High School (9-12)
Dr. Dorothy Handfield, Principal
 Newark School of Data Science and Information Technology (9)
Dr. Liana Summey, Principal
 Newark School of Global Studies (9)
Nelson Ruiz, Principal
Newark School of Fashion Design (9)
Sakina Pitts, Principal
Newark Vocational High School (388; 9-11)
Lucinda Eason, Principal
 Science Park High School (868; 7-12)
Angela Mincy, Principal
 Technology High School (685; 9-12)
Edwin Reyes, Principal
 University High School (486; 7-12)
Genique Flournoy-Hamilton, Principal
 Weequahic High School (385; 9-12)
Andre Hollis, Principal
 West Side High School (620; 9-12)
Akbar Cook, Principal

Ungraded
 John F. Kennedy School (143; PK-12)
Jill Summers-Phillips, Principal
 New Jersey Regional Day School - Newark (122; KG-12)
Jennifer Mitchell, Principal

School uniforms
Beginning in the 2008-2009 school year, students in elementary and middle school were required to wear school uniforms. Beginning in September 2010 high school students were required to wear uniforms.

References

External links 

Newark Public Schools

School Data for the Newark Public Schools, National Center for Education Statistics
Chalkbeat Newark - Education News in Newark

New Jersey Abbott Districts
New Jersey District Factor Group A
School districts in Essex County, New Jersey
Education in Newark, New Jersey